The Arab Socialist Ba'ath Party – Egypt Region ( Hizb Al-Ba'ath Al-Arabi Al-Ishtiraki – Misr) is an Egyptian Neo-Ba'athist political party. It is the Egyptian regional branch of the Iraqi-led Ba'ath Party.

The party supports the removal of Bashar al-Assad as President of Syria while opposing any foreign intervention in the conflict, whether by Israel, Turkey or Iran, as the party believes all such countries have ulterior motives and seek to undermine Syria.

The party was outlawed in the early 1990s and two Iraqi Intelligence Officials were detained on 14 April 1991 with $38,000 in their possession, money which the Egyptian authorities claimed was to be used to fund sabotage operations in Egypt.

Several other Egyptian Ba'athists, including the poet Muhammad Afifi Matar, were also detained in April 1991 on suspicion of involvement in an Iraqi terrorist plot.

References

External links
Facebook
Twitter

Arab nationalism in Egypt
Ba'athist parties
Egypt
Banned political parties in Egypt
Banned socialist parties
Nationalist parties in Egypt
Political parties with year of establishment missing
Socialist parties in Egypt